Ophthalmoglipa iriana is a species of beetle in the genus Ophthalmoglipa of the family Mordellidae. It was described in 1998.

References

Beetles described in 1998
Mordellidae